William Moseley "Fishbait" Miller (July 20, 1909 – September 12, 1989) was an American who worked in the United States House of Representatives. He served as Doorkeeper of the United States House of Representatives from 1949 to 1953 and again from 1955 to 1974.

Early life 
William Moseley Miller was born on July 20, 1909, in Pascagoula, Mississippi to Albert Magnus Miller, a sea captain, and his wife Nettie Maddox. Miller worked at the local pharmacy for several years, where he met William Colmer, then a district attorney. Colmer helped him get into Harrison-Stone Junior College, which he attended from 1929 to 1932.

Career 
Miller began working at the United States House of Representatives in 1933 as a clerk in the House's Post Office. Colmer had offered him the job after being elected to the House. By 1947, he was minority doorkeeper for the House and two years later he was elected to the post of Doorkeeper of the United States House of Representatives. In this role, he oversaw more than 350 employees and a $3.5 million budget. He served as doorkeeper from 1949 to 1953 and again from 1955 to 1974, and was minority doorkeeper from 1953 to 1955 during the 83rd United States Congress, when the House was controlled by the Republican Party. When Miller drew office assignments for House members, he was known to sand his fingertips in order to identify the discs he was drawing and ensure that Democratic members received desirable offices.

Miller was known for having a "flamboyant personality and affinity for the public spotlight", for his announcement of "Mr. Speaker, the President of the United States", during the State of the Union speech, and for enforcing traditions of the House. For example, he once told Bella Abzug to remove her hat before entering the chamber. In response, she told Miller to "go fuck yourself". Miller also functioned in the role by escorting visiting foreign dignitaries. A 1950 profile in The New York Times described Miller as "odd-jobs man for his 435 bosses", mentioning that he functioned as "baby-sitter, cigar-lighter, gum-giver and even water boy". He earned $40,000 a year, $2,500 less than a congressperson. In 1951, Miller drew attention for addressing the visiting Princess Elizabeth of the United Kingdom with the salutation, "Howdy, Ma'am", and greeting her husband, Prince Philip, Duke of Edinburgh, with "Howdy, suh".

In 1974, Miller faced competition for his job for the first time since 1949. He had been increasingly criticized for enjoying attention too much, which "rankled" some members of Congress. On December 2, 1974, he was ousted and replaced by James T. Molloy. Upon leaving the post, Miller remarked, "I have lived a good life, a full life", and, "I have enjoyed every minute of it and as I leave I have no regrets and no axes to grind".

Miller wrote Fishbait: The Memoirs of the Congressional Doorkeeper with Frances Spatz Leighton, which was published in 1977.

Personal life
Miller married Mabel Breeland in 1937. They had one child. 

Miller died on September 12, 1989, in Greensboro, North Carolina of a heart attack. The Washington Post described him as an "enthusiastic socializer and an irrepressible dynamo".

References

External links 
 Finding aid for the William "Fishbait" Miller collection
 "Opens The Door On Capitol Folly"

1909 births
1989 deaths
Employees of the United States House of Representatives
People from Pascagoula, Mississippi
Mississippi Gulf Coast Community College alumni
Writers from Mississippi
American memoirists